This is a list of international organisations which have Portuguese as an official, administrative or working language.

See also
List of countries where Portuguese is an official language
List of international organisations which have French as an official language

Portuguese language
International, Portuguese
Portuguese language lists